Rožle Prezelj (born 26 September 1979) is a Slovenian high jumper.

He born in Maribor, Prezelj represented Slovenia at the 2004, 2008 and 2012 Summer Olympics. His best result was at the 2008 Olympics where he finished 12th in the high jump. His father Dušan, who competed in the decathlon, had a high jump personal best of 2.15 m (1976) and his mother Stanka Lovše - Prezelj was a two-time Yugoslavian high jump champion with a personal best of 1.86 m (1981).

After his retirement from competition, he entered the administrative field and was elected chairman of the IAAF Athlete's Commission, responsible for transforming athlete's concerns into changes at the governing body. He succeeded Frank Fredericks in the role.

International competitions

References

External links

1979 births
Living people
Sportspeople from Maribor
Slovenian male high jumpers
Olympic athletes of Slovenia
Athletes (track and field) at the 2004 Summer Olympics
Athletes (track and field) at the 2008 Summer Olympics
Athletes (track and field) at the 2012 Summer Olympics
World Athletics Championships athletes for Slovenia
Athletes (track and field) at the 2001 Mediterranean Games
Athletes (track and field) at the 2005 Mediterranean Games
Athletes (track and field) at the 2013 Mediterranean Games
Mediterranean Games competitors for Slovenia
Slovenian athletics coaches